The year 1823 in architecture involved some significant events.

Buildings and structures

Buildings

 Work begins on the British Museum in London, designed by Robert Smirke (later Sir Robert).
 Work begins on the Altes Museum in Berlin, designed by Karl Friedrich Schinkel, which is completed in 1830.
 Work completed on St George's Church, Brandon Hill in Bristol, England, designed by Robert Smirke in Greek Revival style.
 Work completed on the Primary Cathedral of Bogotá, Colombia.
 Work completed on the Admiralty building, Saint Petersburg designed by Andreyan Zakharov in 1806.
 Work completed on the core of Massachusetts General Hospital, Bulfinch Building, designed by Charles Bulfinch.
 William Strickland builds St. Stephen's Episcopal Church, Philadelphia, United States, one of the first Gothic revival buildings.

Awards
 Grand Prix de Rome, architecture: Félix Duban.

Births
 March 8 – Thomas Fuller, Canadian architect (died 1898)
 July 7 – Francis Fowke, Anglo-Irish architect and military engineer (died 1865)
 July 23 – Edwin May, American architect working in Indianapolis (died 1880)
 August 18 – John Thomas Emmett, English architect (died 1898)
 September 21 – Charles Barry, Jr., English architect (died 1900)

Deaths
 June 16 – Archibald Elliot, Scottish architect (born 1761)
 August 16 – Louis-Martin Berthault, French architect (born 1770)
 Edward Holl, English architect to the Navy Board

References 

Architecture
Years in architecture
19th-century architecture